Nema problema may refer to:

 Nema problema (1984 film), a Yugoslavian film
 Nema problema (2004 film), an Italian film